List of mountains in Kenya is a general list of mountains in Kenya with elevation.

Seven of Kenya's mountains, Mount Kenya, Mount Elgon, Mount Satima, Chepunyal Hills, Cherang'any Hills, Mount Kulal, and Mount Ng'iro, are among the ultra prominent peaks of Africa.

List

See also 
Geography of Kenya
List of Ultras of Africa
List of mountain ranges of Kenya
Highest mountain peaks of Africa

References

External links
Kenya - Highest Mountains

 
Mountains
Kenya
Kenya